Russell Leroy Wilkins (March 31, 1923 – January 22, 1981) was an American professional basketball player. He played in the National Basketball League in five games for the Anderson Duffey Packers during the 1946–47 season and averaged 1.0 points per game.

References

1923 births
1981 deaths
United States Marine Corps personnel of World War II
American men's basketball players
Anderson Packers players
Basketball players from Fort Wayne, Indiana
Forwards (basketball)
Guards (basketball)
Military personnel from Indiana
Trine Thunder men's basketball players